Royal Air Force Debden or more simply RAF Debden is a former Royal Air Force station located  southeast of Saffron Walden and approximately  north of the village of Debden in North Essex, England

History
The airfield was opened in April 1937 and was first used by the Royal Air Force. One of Debden's early and most bizarre experiences was when the airfield was chosen as a location for the film "It's in the Air" in which George Formby was to pilot a Hawker Fury through Hangar No. 3.  The rather sharper angle of the hangars at Debden built around the tarmac apron allowed free access at both ends of the end hangar.  The flying for the sequence was actually done by Flying Officer R. H. A. Lee who disappeared on 18 August 1940 when he was last seen ten miles north of Foulness Point chasing three German aircraft out to sea.

RAF Fighter Command use

Hard surface runways were laid in 1940. During the early years of the Second World War it was a Sector Station, with an Operations Block for No. 11 Group RAF during the Battle of Britain.  Many different RAF units were posted to Debden, including No 17, 29, 65, 73, 80, 85, 87, 111, 157, 257, 418, 504 and 601 Squadrons.

The airfield was attacked several times during the Battle of Britain. The first air-raid sounded on 18 June 1940, although the first bombs were not dropped on the airfield until seven days later.  Then, on 2 August, came a heavy attack which destroyed several buildings, killing five, to be followed by another severe raid on 31 August.  During August and September, Debden fighters claimed seventy aircraft destroyed, thirty probables and forty-one damaged.

In 1970, Peter Townsend, the commander of 85 Squadron, which operated from Debden during the Battle of Britain, published a best-selling history of the Battle, "Duel of Eagles.".

On 28 January 1941, the station was visited by King George VI and Queen Elizabeth, and the following month by a German aircrew; it was on 4 February 1941 that a German pilot landed his aircraft and taxied to the watch office (control tower), at which point the German pilot must have realised his mistake as he took off in a hurry.

During May through into September 1942 Debden was used by No. 71 and 121 "Eagle Squadrons" with Spitfire V's.

United States Army Air Forces use

 
The airfield was transferred on 12 September 1942 to the United States Army Air Forces Eighth Air Force.  Debden was assigned USAAF designation Station 356.

USAAF Station Units assigned to RAF Debden were: 
 33rd Service Group
 41st and 45th Service Squadrons; HHS 33d Service Group
 18th Weather Squadron
 24th Station Complement Squadron
 225th Anti-Aircraft Artillery Searchlight Battalion
 1030th Signal Company
 1063rd Military Police Company
 1126th Quartermaster Company
 1192nd Military Police Company
 1770th Ordnance Supply & Maintenance Company
 2119th Engineer Fire Fighting Platoon
 546th Army Postal Unit

4th Fighter Group
With the transfer of the airfield and the entry of the United States into the war, Americans serving in the RAF Eagle squadrons were transferred into the American ranks, with 71, 121 and 133 RAF Eagle Squadrons becoming the 4th Fighter Group. The group was under the command of the 65th Fighter Wing of the VIII Fighter Command.  Aircraft of the group were identified by red around their cowlings and tails.

The group consisted of the following squadrons:
 334th Fighter Squadron (QP) (Former 71 Squadron)
 335th Fighter Squadron (WD) (Former 121 Squadron)
 336th Fighter Squadron (VF) (Former 133 Squadron)

The 4th Fighter Group destroyed more enemy aircraft in the air and on the ground than any other fighter group of the Eighth Air Force. The group operated first with Supermarine Spitfires but changed to Republic P-47 Thunderbolts in March 1943 and to North American P-51 Mustangs in April 1944.

On numerous occasions the 4th FG escorted Boeing B-17 Flying Fortress and Consolidated B-24 Liberator bombers that were attacking factories, submarine pens, V-weapon sites, and other targets in France, the Low Countries, or Germany.  The group went out sometimes with a small force of bombers to draw up the enemy's fighters so they could be destroyed in aerial combat.  At other times the 4th attacked the enemy's air power by strafing and dive-bombing airfields.  They also hit troops, supply depots, roads, bridges, rail lines, and trains.

The unit participated in the intensive campaign against the German Air Force and aircraft industry during Big Week, 20–25 February 1944. They received a Distinguished Unit Citation for aggressiveness in seeking out and destroying enemy aircraft and in attacking enemy air airfields during the period 5 March – 24 April 1944.

The 4th FG flew interdictory and counter-air missions during the invasion of Normandy in June 1944 and supported the airborne invasion of the Netherlands in September. They participated in the Battle of the Bulge, December 1944-January 1945, and provided cover for the airborne assault across the Rhine in March 1945.

In October 1944, No. 616 Squadron RAF, the first RAF jet unit, had a detachment of Gloster Meteors at Debden to practise affiliation tactics with the 4th Fighter Group.

With the cessation of hostilities, the group was briefly moved to RAF Steeple Morden in early July 1945, then on 10 November 1945 the group returned to the US and was inactivated at Camp Kilmer New Jersey.

Postwar Royal Air Force use
RAF Debden was returned to Royal Air Force control on 5 September 1945. Debden became a unit of the RAF Technical Training Command, firstly, as the Empire Radio School then, in 1949, a Signals Division and later the Debden Division of the RAF Technical College, later being joined by a Bomb Disposal Unit and a Motor Transport Repair Unit.

Debden became home to No. 614 Volunteer Gliding School RAF (614 VGS) in 1966.  The School remained at RAF Debden until 1982 when the British Army required the airfield for tank training and the school was found a new home at RAF Wethersfield where the school opened for operations on 6 June 1982.
In 1967 Debden became an overspill training centre for civilian police covered by No 5 district.
On 18 October 1973 a Nissen hut, officially designated Building 210 which had been used by the 4th Fighter Group during the war was presented to the USAF to be flown to the Wright-Patterson AFB Ohio to be re-assembled and displayed in the USAF museum.

The RAF Police School had moved to Debden in 1960 and the unit became The RAF Police Depot.  From 1968, the Provost & Security Support Squadron was also based at Debden.   In the 1960s, the Unit also trained members of the Air Force Department Constabulary (until that force was amalgamated into the Ministry of Defence Police).  On 5 June 1973, RAF Debden was subject of a Royal Review by Princess Margaret. The RAF Police Dog School had moved to Debden from Netheravon in 1962.    Apart from RAF Police, the Dog School also trained UK-based USAF Police to handle RAF Police Dogs.   The School hosted the RAF Police Dog Demonstration Team which, apart from its appearances over many years in the UK, toured America in September 1969.  In 1974, the RAF Police School moved to RAF Newton, Nottinghamshire, whilst the Dog School remained at Debden.    In July 1975, the RAF Police Dog School hosted Debden's final RAF Police Dog Trials before the Dog School also moved to join the rest of RAF Police Training at RAF Newton in late Summer 1975.  The station officially closed on 21 August 1975.

The following units were also here at some point:

Units

British Army
After the RAF left the site became Carver Barracks.  Due to its postwar use, the airfield and technical site is almost completely intact from its World War II configuration, although all but one of the three "C" type hangars made famous by Formby have now been demolished on the main airfield and two other hangars remaining to the south of the main site.

See also

 List of former Royal Air Force stations

References

Citations

Bibliography

 Freeman, Roger A. (1978) Airfields of the Eighth: Then and Now. After the Battle 
 Freeman, Roger A. (1991) The Mighty Eighth The Colour Record. Cassell & Co. 
 Ravenstein, Charles A. (1984). Air Force Combat Wings Lineage and Honors Histories 1947-1977. Maxwell AFB, Alabama: Office of Air Force History. .

   www.controltowers.co.uk Debden
  www.littlefriends.co.uk 4th FG
 USAAS-USAAC-USAAF-USAF Aircraft Serial Numbers--1908 to present

External links

 Detailed historic record about RAF Debden
 4th Fighter Group Association website
 RAF Debden – 2002 photo tour
 GI Trace – Station Numbers

Airfields of the VIII Fighter Command in the United Kingdom
Royal Air Force stations in Essex
Military units and formations established in 1937
Royal Air Force stations of World War II in the United Kingdom